Hauppauge can refer to:

Hauppauge, New York, a hamlet on Long Island in the United States
Hauppauge Computer Works, a computer component company located in Hauppauge, New York
Hauppauge MediaMVP, a network media player by Hauppauge Computer Works
Hauppauge Industrial Association, a business organization in Hauppauge, New York
Hauppauge Union Free School District in Hauppauge, New York
Hauppauge High School